Billy "Harp" Hamilton (born March 25, 1952) is an American blues/soul-R&B singer, songwriter, harmonica-guitar player.

Career and albums
Active since 1965, Hamilton has recorded four albums: "Blues/Soul/R&B" (2002), "Live at the Oxford Music Festival" (2005), "Live at Club Hades" (2007), and "Campesino Blues"(2011). "My Baby Must Have Died," written by Hamilton, is featured on a compilation album from a British label called Funkee Fish Records. "I Sold Your Ring Today," another Hamilton composition, is included on a compilation CD from the Network Pacific label in California. Five songs from "Campesino Blues" were selected for the soundtrack of Purgatory Comics, an independent film released by Warm Milk Productions in 2012.

Touring
Hamilton lived and toured in Europe from 2006 to 2010. In 2011, he relocated to Austin, TX, where he was signed by AMI Records, a small independent label that released "Campesino Blues" (nine studio tracks plus three live tracks recorded in Poland and Austin, TX) at the end of 2011. Billy Hamilton now plays various venues in central Texas with the latest incarnation of his band, The Lowriders.

Discography
Albums in order from newest to oldest

Campesino Blues
 Dressed Up and Messed Up
 Campesino Blues
 The Older I Get
 Bandleader's Blues
 As Long As I'm Crying
 Latex Love
 Hunkering Down
 My Baby Must Have Died
 Blindfold Blues
 Fever
 Pay Some Money
 Use Me

Live at Club Hades
 Someday After While
 Nadine
 Stormy Monday
 Big Leg Woman
 My Baby Must Have Died
 Born Under A Bad Sign
 Unchain My Heart
 Walkin' The Dog
 Use Me

Live at The Oxford Music Festival
 Walkin' The Dog
 Key to the Highway
 Midnight Hour
 Born Under a Bad Sign
 Nadine
 Feelin' All Right
 Shotgun

Blues/Soul/R&B
 My Baby Must Have Died
 Walkin' The Dog
 Unchain My Heart
 Nadine
 Big Leg Woman
 Blindfold Blues
 There'll Be A Price

References

 Olsztyn Blues Festival
 The Hamburg Express Magazine

External links 
 Official site

Living people
Place of birth missing (living people)
American soul singers
1952 births
American singer-songwriters
American male singer-songwriters